World Literature Today is an American magazine of international literature and culture published at the University of Oklahoma. The magazine's stated goal is to publish international essays, poetry, fiction, interviews, and book reviews for a non-academic audience.  It was founded under the name Books Abroad in 1927 by Roy Temple House, a professor at the University of Oklahoma. In January 1977, the journal assumed its present name, World Literature Today.

History

The first issue of World Literature Today (WLT) was published in 1927 and was 32 pages long. By its fiftieth year, the issues were more than 250 pages long. In 2006, WLT switched from a quarterly to a bimonthly publication.

House served as editor from 1927 until his retirement in 1949. Todd Downing, a Choctaw author and former student of House's, worked for the publication in varying capacities between 1928 and 1934. House was succeeded as editor by the German critic and novelist Ernst Erich Noth, who went on to edit the journal for ten years. During his tenure, Noth narrowed the scope of the publication to writers of the twentieth century and to review only books that had been published no more than two years earlier. He also introduced a new feature, "Periodicals in Review" (sometimes appearing as "Periodicals at Large"), which surveyed the policies and initiatives of several literary journals from Europe, the Americas, and throughout the world.

Viennese scholar Wolfgang Bernard Fleischmann directed WLT for about two years beginning in 1959. In 1961, Fleischmann was succeeded by Czech émigré Robert Vlach, a professor of modern languages at the University of Oklahoma. Vlach established a new review section in the journal devoted to Slavic languages. He also initiated the Books Abroad symposia, which took place at the annual convention of the Modern Language Association. After Vlach's death in 1966, former Assistant Editor Bernice Duncan briefly served as editor until Ivar Ivask assumed the role in 1967. In 1977, the name of the magazine was changed from Books Abroad to World Literature Today.

Robert Con Davis-Undiano, Professor of English at the University of Oklahoma, became the editor of WLT in 1999.

Sponsored prizes and festivals
World Literature Today sponsors the biennial Neustadt International Prize for Literature, the NSK Neustadt Prize for Children's Literature, and the annual Puterbaugh Festival of International Literature and Culture.

Neustadt International Prize for Literature, worth $50,000
Puterbaugh Conference on World Literature
NSK Neustadt Prize for Children's Literature

Nobel Prize connection 
Since the founding of World Literature Today, the magazine's editors have encouraged debate about the annual presentation of the Nobel Prize in Literature. In 1940, the publication hosted a "Super-Nobel" election in which contributors and other specialists were invited to choose the writer they felt had offered the most significant contribution to world literature in the first third of the twentieth century, regardless of whether that writer had won the Nobel Prize. The award went to Thomas Mann, who won the Nobel Prize in 1929 and was a frequent contributor to World Literature Today.

In 1948, WLT founding editor Roy Temple House was nominated for the Nobel Peace Prize. When the South Central Modern Language Association held its annual meeting in Norman, Oklahoma in October that year, the association formally endorsed Professor House for the prize.

The Spring 1981 issue of WLT was devoted entirely to the presentation of the members of the Swedish academy, many of whom were successful creative writers in their own right. In 1951 the Nobel Foundation chose the University of Oklahoma Press to issue the first English-language edition of its authoritative volume, entitled Nobel: The Man and His Prizes. Also, the often-synchronistic relationship between the Neustadt Prize, once described by the New York Times as the "Oklahoma 'Nobel'" (February 1982), and the Nobel Prize itself is demonstrated in the number of convergences. Between 1970 and 2016, thirty-two writers affiliated with the Neustadt Prize (as jurors, candidates, or winners) went on to receive the Nobel after their association with the Neustadt, including Tomas Tranströmer, the 1990 Neustadt laureate and 2011 Nobel laureate.

Recent history

In late 2000, the editors worked with forty scholars to establish a list of the "Most Important Works in World Literature, 1927-2001," a project organized and timed to help celebrate WLT's seventy-fifth year of uninterrupted publication.  The top 40 list was chosen by specialists with the non-specialist in mind to invite response and debate among readers and writers.

Further, a forum for readers' correspondence was also initiated in 2000.

See also
List of literary magazines

References

External links
World Literature Today official site

Bimonthly magazines published in the United States
Literary magazines published in the United States
Cultural magazines published in the United States
Magazines established in 1927
University of Oklahoma
Magazines published in Oklahoma
1927 establishments in Oklahoma
Literary translation magazines